Belokurikha is a town and a balneological resort in the Altai region of Russia, located on the Belokurikha River  south of Barnaul, the administrative center of the krai. As of the 2010 Census, its population was 14,661.

Administrative and municipal status
Within the framework of administrative divisions, it is incorporated as a city of federal subject significance — an administrative unit of status equivalent to that of a district. As a municipal division, the town of Belokurikha is incorporated as "Belokurikha Urban Okrug".

Physical and geographical characteristics

Geographical location 
Located in the South-Eastern part of Altai Krai in the valley of the river Belokurikha, at an altitude of 240-250 meters above sea level at the foot of the mountain Churches. It is located in the foothills of Altai, on the site of thermal radon waters.

Territory: 92.3 km2.

Climate 
The climate is characterized by high average annual air temperature for Siberia and mainly windless weather, the absence of large changes in atmospheric pressure. In General, it is somewhat softer than in the adjacent Biysk plain. By the number of Sunny days in the year Belokurikha comparable to the resorts of the Crimea and Caucasus, Sunny days in the year: 260. Precipitation up to 800 mm, mainly in summer.

Spring in relatively early and warm. In summer, the greater area is dominated by clear, stable, mild weather, and the annual duration of sunshine is 1900-2000 hours. The average July temperature is +18 °C...+20 °C. summer months are characterized by low atmospheric pressure (about 733 mm Hg). art.), compared with the winter and spring months (743...748 mm Hg. V.). Autumn is warm with little rainfall. Snow cover is set in November. Winter is characterized by dry, almost windless weather with many clear and Sunny days. Average temperature in winter: -15,9 °C, sometimes there are more severe frosts.

Flora 
The southern part of the resort town is bordered by spurs of the Cherginsky ridge, which is covered with coniferous vegetation and shrubs: Rowan, cherry, maral. In the vicinity of the city are widespread acclimatized plants, unusual for the South of Western Siberia, such as oak and Manchurian nut.

History 
In the 1920s, on the site of the village Novobelokurikha was founded resort village. Here were constructed office, dining room, dispensary and Solarium, and in 1928 erected baths for 24 baths and polyclinic in 1931-1934 years erected a wooden building with rooms. Here rested the leaders of the Soviet state and their wives, lived A Russian writer K. G. Paustovsky.

In 1942, the all-Union pioneer camp "Artek" was evacuated to Belokurikha.

The formation of the largest resort in the East of the country became possible thanks to the Soviet statesman Efim Pavlovich Slavsky. It was E. p. Slavsky who was at the origins of the resort town of Belokurikha, which is now widely known not only in Russia but also far beyond its borders.

In the 1960s were built most of the resorts in which are now treated and relax resort guests. The first in 1961 was commissioned sanatorium "metallurg", now "Eden".

In 1970, the village received the status of a resort of all-Union importance, in 1982-the status of the city, and since 1992 is a resort of Federal importance.

The President of Russia Vladimir Putin visited Belokurikha in 2003 and 2016.

Transport 
Nearest cities: Biysk (65 km), Gorno-Altaysk (115 km), Barnaul (236 km). The city is connected by bus with Barnaul, Biysk, Gorno-Altaisk, Kemerovo, Novokuznetsk, Mezhdurechensk, Novosibirsk and Tomsk. The nearest airport is Gorno-Altaysk airport and Biysk train station.

Population 
As of January 1, 2018, the city was on the 786th place out of 1113 cities of the Russian Federation in terms of population.

Spa 
Currently, the resort area of Belokurikha is able to accept at the same time more than 5 thousand tourists. There are 19 sanatorium-resort and sanatorium-health-improving establishments on 5000 places in the city, balneotherapy includes 27 types of procedures on mineral and fresh water. The number of sanatoriums, health resorts, hotels, small boarding houses in a specially protected natural area is growing steadily. In 2006, several public buildings with a total area of 22 952.4 m2 with a total cost of 239.6 million rubles were commissioned on a turnkey basis. Construction is carried out at the expense of private investors.

In 2015, the 219-year project was visited by thousands of tourists, including in spas has hosted over 130 thousand people .

Medical factor

Climatotherapy 
It is characterized by a relatively high average annual air temperature (+ 4 °C) in Siberia. Mild winter, mild summer, warm weather of spring and autumn months, mainly windless, short-term frosts in winter, followed by frequent thaws and constant barometric pressure.

Mountain air 
Light air ions is the main treatment component of the mountain air. In Belokurikha, the content of light aeroions is from 1014 to 2400, which is twice that of the world-famous Swiss resort of Davos (1006). Increased ionization of the air is especially marked in the surrounding hills — the terraces.

Thermal water 
Belokurikhinskoe sources are the thermal nitric-siliceous radonotherapy water or nitrogen baths. They come to the surface with a temperature of 30 °C and 42 °C. they contain a small amount of radon, a lot of nitrogen, fluorine and silicic acid, as well as various trace elements. Water alkaline, mineral. Also used therapeutic mud from salt lakes of the Altai territory.

Ski mountaineering 
At the beginning of 2010, the resort was equipped with three main ski slopes: "Katun" - the Central slope of the resort with a length of 800 meters, "North" with a length of 650 meters and" Church " with a length of 2050 meters.

"Siberian Davos" 
At present, Belokurikha is gaining fame not only as a balneological resort, but also as a venue for major events: the international forum of UNESCO and the wildlife Fund under the motto "Nature, ecology, man", the annual "Siberian Davos" (official name "Western Siberia: region, economy, investment") — a traditional international economic conference that gathers economists and political scientists of high rank.

Research Institute of balneology 
In February 2016, the Altai research Institute of balneology was established in Belokurikha . The institution plans to study the natural healing factors of the region and develop on their basis methods and methods of treatment, as well as to draw up programs for the development of the sanatorium complex of the region, the resorts "Belokurikha" and "Belokurikha-2". Research Institute is a part of the Siberian Federal scientific and clinical center. The staff consists of 40 specialists from Tomsk, Barnaul and Belokurikha.

Belokurikha-2 
Construction of tourist and recreational cluster "Belokurikha-2" is located 10 kilometers from the town of Belokurikha. It will include a developed medical base tourist infrastructure, interesting layout, as well as seven ski slopes. The new cluster will accommodate a growing number of tourists (the average annual load of health resorts in Belokurikha is more than 85%).

As of March 2015, 3.1 billion rubles out of 10 planned have been invested in the construction of the cluster.

In 2017, it was planned to prepare engineering infrastructure: to put into operation a power line, to carry out a gas pipeline and water supply, as well as a Sewerage system.

In 2018, the new tourist complex Belokurikha-2  welcomes guests.

Historical-architectural complex "St. Andrew's village" runs from 2017. The distillery, the house of the healer and the former dwelling house of the merchant Andreev are restored and open for visits. Restaurant "Gogol" offers an extensive menu with a national flavor in the form of pies, salted bacon, sbitnya, green cabbage soup and other dishes, open room-Museum of the writer, which recreated the famous images.

Mishina Gora offers the highest mountain-ski complex in Altai with a modern set of comfortable services, technical equipment and safety level.

Famous tourist routes Belokurikha: Church, Round, rock confessions, two brothers, Turtle, Gates of love and others. "Rock Four brothers" refers to the state nature reserve "Tigireksky" and is located 3.5 km South of Belokurikha. The monument covers an area of about 36.7 hectares and includes the outlier "Four brothers" and other small outliers within a radius of 250 meters. Vertical dismemberment of granite rock resembles four heads, which served as the basis for the name. The height of the granite block is about 12 meters.

The entire ridge, on which the outliers are located, is covered with birch and pine forest, which grows about 60 species of plants, some of them are listed in the Red book.

In total, up to 14 million tourists come to the region during the year, it was among the three leaders of Russian health tourism at the end of 2017 (analytical Agency "Turstat").

Mass media

Radios 
101.1 MHz "Police wave" + local broadcasting " Katun FM»;

104 MHz "radio — Belokurikha" (exclusively local broadcasting);

104,4 MHz NRJ;

106.9 MHz "Road radio»;

107.4 MHz "Radio of Russia" + local broadcasting of GTRK " Altai»;

TV 
5 MV of the "First channel»;

6 MV "Russia-1" + local broadcasting of GTRK "Altai»;

22 DMV the First multiplex of digital television of Russia;

28 DMV "TV Center" + " TNT»;

33 DMV Second multiplex of digital television of Russia;

35 MSK "NTV»;

39 DMV " Fifth channel»;

45 MSK "Match TV»;

50 DMV " Katun 24»;

References

External links
 Official website of Belokurikha 
 Directory of organizations in Belokurikha 
 Belokurikhinskaya city Museum. S. I. Gulyaev 

1803 establishments in the Russian Empire
Cities and towns in Altai Krai
Populated places established in 1803
Spa towns in Russia
